Fuzzy math is a catch phrase used often by American politicians to describe numbers, particularly in regard to government spending, that they claim do not add up correctly. It is frequently used by politicians who are dismissing another politician's numbers as doubtful or otherwise inaccurate.

Origin
The term "fuzzy math" was first heard during the debates prior to the 2000 U.S. presidential election. It was used by George W. Bush, who dismissed the figures used by his opponent Al Gore. Others later turned the term against Bush. The term has since been used by many other politicians in attacks against opponents or various stances, such as concern over global warming.

References

American political catchphrases